Shivaji Hockey Stadium is a hockey stadium located in New Delhi, India. The stadium was one that was selected to host hockey matches for 2010 Commonwealth Games but stadium was not ready before the games as construction of seating facilities and one venues which was come controversies of Commonwealth Games.

In 2004, the stadium was identified as home for India women's hockey team and selected venue for the practice venue for hockey and  swimming but later its changed to 
Dhyan Chand National Stadium and SPM Swimming Pool Complex.

The stadium has been a host for games of India's UBA Pro Basketball League as well.

Features 

 Synthetic surfaces
 Parking lot of 1500 vehicles with multi-levels
 Changing rooms, physio rooms etc.

Transport

Shivaji Stadium metro station is just under a Km from Shivaji Hockey Stadium.

References

External links
 2010 Commonwealth Hockey Stadium

Field hockey venues in India
Basketball venues in India
Sports venues completed in 1964
2010 Commonwealth Games venues
Rebuilt buildings and structures in India
Monuments and memorials to Shivaji
Swimming venues in India
1964 establishments in Delhi
20th-century architecture in India